The 1997 BellSouth Open was a men's tennis tournament played on outdoor hard courts at the ASB Tennis Centre in Auckland in New Zealand and was part of the World Series of the 1997 ATP Tour. The tournament ran from 6 January through 12 January 1997. Unseeded Jonas Björkman won the singles title.

Finals

Singles

 Jonas Björkman defeated  Kenneth Carlsen 7–6(7–0), 6–0
 It was Björkman's 1st title of the year and the 13th of his career.

Doubles

 Ellis Ferreira /  Patrick Galbraith defeated  Rick Leach /  Jonathan Stark 6–4, 4–6, 7–6
 It was Ferreira's 1st title of the year and the 4th of his career. It was Galbraith's 1st title of the year and the 30th of his career.

References

External links
 
 ATP – tournament profile
 ITF – tournament edition details

BellSouth Open
ATP Auckland Open
BellSouth Open
January 1997 sports events in New Zealand